Patrick Leslie, 1st Lord Lindores (died between 22 May and 5 October 1608) was a member of the Scottish nobility.

Biography 
He was the second son of Andrew Leslie, 5th Earl of Rothes, and his first wife, Grizel Hamilton. He was Commendator of Lindores as early as 1569 and until 1600.

Leslie had a role in devising the entertainments at the baptism of Prince Henry at Stirling Castle in August 1594 and rode in the tournament dressed as Penthesilea Queen of the Amazons. 

In November 1591 the rebel Earl of Bothwell told his wife that he planned to visit her father in Orkney, and it was thought for a time that Bothwell planned to invade the island.

Anne of Denmark and the Earl of Orkney stayed with him at Lindores in August 1595.

In September 1598 James VI came to Abdie to arrest John Arnot, Goodman of Woodmill, for the murder of John Murray, a servant of Lord Lindores.

In July 1607 Lindores wrote a letter of petition to the Earl of Salisbury. He said he had served King James since 1579, 14 years in his bedchamber. The petition followed expenses made to get his brother-in-law, Sir Robert Stewart, out of the Counter Prison, helped by Lord Roxburghe and the Master of Orkney.

Family
Leslie married Jean Stewart (c. 1563 - ?), daughter of Robert Stewart, 1st Earl of Orkney, a natural son of King James V of Scotland by Euphemia Elphinstone, and his wife Jean Kennedy. Their children were: 
 Patrick Leslie, 2nd Lord Lindores (d. 1649)
 James Leslie, 3rd Lord Lindores
 Robert Leslie of Kinclaven, Perthshire, and of Westminster, London (c. 1598 - c. 1675), married first Frances, widow of Sir John Pakington and daughter of John and Dorothy (Puckering) Ferrers, and married second, at St Giles in the Fields, London, on 4 November 1633, Catherine, daughter of Edward and Elizabeth (Pigott) Bassett
 Ludovick Leslie
 David Leslie, 1st Lord Newark (c. 1601 - 1682)
 George Leslie
 Henry Leslie
 Margaret Leslie, married (contract 1609) John Drummond, 2nd Lord Maderty
 Elizabeth Leslie, married (contract 1628) Sir James Sinclair
 Anna Leslie, married John Forbes
 Janet Leslie, married Sir John Cunningham
 Euphemia Leslie, married c. 1616 Sir David Barclay

References 

 James Balfour Paul, ed., The Scots Peerage, 9 vols. (Edinburgh, 1904–14), 5:382-85, 9:127.
 G.E. Cokayne, The Complete Peerage, new ed., ed. Vicary Gibbs et al., 14 vols. in 15 (London, 1910–59; Stroud, 1998), 8:2.
 Edward J. Davies, "A Descent of Tony Blair from James V, King of Scots", The Genealogist, 22 (2008), pp. 247-55.

Lords of Parliament (pre-1707)
1608 deaths
Year of birth unknown
16th-century Scottish people
Younger sons of earls
Peers of Scotland created by James VI